The 2016 NorthEast United FC season was the club's third season since its establishment in 2014 and their third season in the Indian Super League.

Background

After the end of the 2014 ISL season, NorthEast United parted ways with their inaugural season head coach, Ricki Herbert. Soon after, César Farías, was named as the new head coach for the 2015 season. The season began for NorthEast United with a 3–1 loss to the Kerala Blasters on 6 October. The team ended the season with six wins through fourteen matches and almost qualified for the finals but were two points short.

Transfers

Pre-season

In

Out

Loan in

Released

End-season

Out
List of players transferred or released from the club after 2016 Indian Super League season.

Loan out
After the end of 2016 Indian Super League season majority of domestic players from NorthEast United were loaned by I-League clubs for 2016–17 season.

Squad

Indian Super League

Results summary

Results by round

Matches

Squad statistics

Appearances and goals

|-
|colspan="14"|Players who left NorthEast United due to injury during the season:
|}

Goal scorers

Disciplinary record

References

NorthEast United FC seasons
NorthEast